Chrysopsis (golden asters), are plants in the family Asteraceae native to the southern and eastern United States. All the species are found in Florida, although some are found in other states as well.

These are annual and perennial herbs bearing daisy-like flower heads with yellow disc florets and usually yellow ray florets. Some species formerly classified in this genus are now included in other genera: Heterotheca, Pityopsis, Stenotus, Ionactis, Aster, Eucephalus, Erigeron, Machaeranthera, Croptilon, Xanthisma, Oclemena, Bradburia, Oxypappus, Arnica, and Helichrysopsis.

Golden asters are often used as food plants by the larvae of some Lepidoptera species, including Schinia petulans (which feeds exclusively on C. subulata).

 Accepted species

 Chrysopsis delaneyi - DeLaney's golden aster - Florida
 Chrysopsis floridana - Florida golden aster - Florida
 Chrysopsis godfreyi - Godfrey's golden aster  - Florida, Alabama
 Chrysopsis gossypina - Cottony golden aster - from Florida north to Virginia and west to Louisiana
 Chrysopsis highlandsensis - Highlands County golden aster  - Florida
 Chrysopsis lanuginosa - Lynn Haven golden aster - Florida
 Chrysopsis latisquamea - Pineland golden aster - Florida
 Chrysopsis linearifolia - Narrowleaf golden aster - Florida
 Chrysopsis mariana - Maryland golden aster  - from Florida north to New York and Ohio, west to Texas
 Chrysopsis scabrella - Coastal plain golden aster  - Florida, Carolinas
 Chrysopsis subulata - Scrubland golden aster - Florida

References

External links
 
 USDA Plants Profile for Chrysopsis
 

 
Asteraceae genera
Endemic flora of the United States
Flora of the Southeastern United States
Taxa named by Thomas Nuttall